Scott Wedgewood (born August 14, 1992) is a Canadian professional ice hockey goaltender for the  Dallas Stars of the National Hockey League (NHL). Wedgewood was selected by the New Jersey Devils in the third round (84th overall) of the 2010 NHL Entry Draft.

Playing career

2011-2016: Junior hockey, NHL debut with Devils
During his fourth and final year of major junior hockey in the 2011–12 season with the Plymouth Whalers in the Ontario Hockey League, Wedgewood was signed by the New Jersey Devils to a three-year, entry-level contract on March 20, 2012.

In the 2015–16 season, on March 20, 2016, he won his NHL debut for the Devils against the Columbus Blue Jackets. In his second game for the Devils, Wedgewood recorded his first NHL shutout against the Pittsburgh Penguins.

2017-present: Playing with the Coyotes and Stars
On July 25, 2017, Wedgewood agreed to return for his sixth season within the Devils organization in agreeing to a one-year, two-way contract extension. He was assigned to begin the 2017–18 season, with inaugural AHL affiliate the Binghamton Devils. He recorded a win in his only game with Binghamton before he was recalled by the Devils due to an injury to starting goaltender Cory Schneider. With the return to health for Schneider, Wedgewood was traded by the Devils to the Arizona Coyotes in exchange for a fifth-round pick in the 2018 NHL Entry Draft on October 28, 2017. However, on February 21, 2018, Wedgewood, and forward Tobias Rieder, were traded to the Los Angeles Kings in exchange for goaltender Darcy Kuemper. He did not play with the Kings, and spent the duration of his contract with the Kings' AHL affiliate, the Ontario Reign.

As a free agent from the Kings, Wedgewood signed a one-year, two-way contract with the Buffalo Sabres on July 1, 2018. In the 2018–19 season, Wedgewood played exclusively with the Sabres AHL affiliate, the Rochester Americans. In 48 appearances with the Americans he posted 28 wins with a .908 save percentage.

Concluding his contract with the Sabres, Wedgewood left as a free agent to sign a one-year, two-way contract with the Tampa Bay Lightning on July 1, 2019. On December 6, while playing for the Syracuse Crunch, he left the game early because he sustained a lower body injury. He would be out for 4–6 weeks. He returned on January 20, where he made 26 saves in a 4–2 Crunch win over the Utica Comets. Wedgewood was one of the eight players called up to the Lightning for their training camp prior to the 2020 Stanley Cup playoffs.

As a free agent from the Stanley Cup-winning Lightning, Wedgewood returned to the New Jersey Devils, as a free agent in agreeing to a one-year, two-way contract on October 11, 2020. On May 10, 2021, Wedgewood was the Devils nominee for the Bill Masterton Memorial Trophy. On July 6, the Devils re-signed Wedgewood to a one-year, two-way contract.

In the following 2021–22 season, Wedgewood began the season as backup to Jonathan Bernier, in the absence of Mackenzie Blackwood. He appeared in three games before he was placed and later claimed off waivers for a second stint with the Arizona Coyotes on November 4, 2021.

On March 20, 2022, Wedgewood was traded by Arizona to the Dallas Stars in exchange for a conditional 2023 fourth-round draft pick.

On June 30, 2022, Wedgewood signed a two-year $2 million contract extension with the Stars.

Career statistics

Regular season and playoffs

International

References

External links
 

1992 births
Living people
Adirondack Thunder players
Albany Devils players
Arizona Coyotes players
Binghamton Devils players
Sportspeople from Brampton
Canadian ice hockey goaltenders
Dallas Stars players
Ice hockey people from Ontario
New Jersey Devils draft picks
New Jersey Devils players
Ontario Reign (AHL) players
Plymouth Whalers players
Rochester Americans players
Syracuse Crunch players
Trenton Titans players